The 1962 South Carolina United States Senate election was held on November 6, 1962 to select the U.S. Senator from the state of South Carolina. Incumbent Democratic Senator Olin D. Johnston defeated Governor Fritz Hollings in the Democratic primary and Republican W. D. Workman, Jr. in the general election.

Democratic primary
The South Carolina Democratic Party held their primary on June 12, 1962.  Olin D. Johnston, the incumbent Senator, faced stiff competition from Governor Fritz Hollings who argued that Johnston was too liberal and not representative of South Carolina interests.  Johnston merely told the voters that he was doing what he thought was best for the agriculture and textile workers of the state.  Hollings was decisively defeated by Johnston because Johnston used his position as Post Office and Civil Service Committee to build 40 new post offices in the state and thus demonstrate the pull he had in Washington to bring home the bacon.

Republican primary
W. D. Workman, Jr., a correspondent for the News and Courier, faced no opposition from South Carolina Republicans and avoided a primary election.

General election campaign
Both Johnston and Workman supported segregation, so the campaign centered on the economic issues of the state.  Workman tried to persuade the voters that Johnston's policies were socialist and that he was too closely aligned with the Kennedy administration.  Johnston was a consistent supporter of socialized health care proposals and Workman was able to win considerable support from the medical establishment.  However, the state's citizens were much poorer than that of the rest of the nation and Johnston's class based appeals made him a very popular figure for the downtrodden of both the white and black races.  The competitive nature of this race foresaw the eventual rise of the Republican Party and that South Carolinians were growing increasingly suspicious of policies generated at the federal level.

Election results

 
 

|-
| 
| colspan=5 |Democratic hold

See also
 List of United States senators from South Carolina
 United States Senate elections, 1962
 United States Senate special election in South Carolina, 1956

References
"Supplemental Report of the Secretary of State to the General Assembly of South Carolina." Reports and Resolutions of South Carolina to the General Assembly of the State of South Carolina. Volume II. Columbia, SC: 1963, p. 6.

South C
1962
1962 South Carolina elections